Emil Loteanu (6 November 1936 – 18 April 2003) was a Moldovan and Soviet film director born in what is now Moldova. He moved to Moscow in his early life. His best known films are Lăutarii, Gypsies Are Found Near Heaven, A Hunting Accident and Anna Pavlova.

Life and career 

Emil Vladimirovich Loteanu was born on 6 November 1936 in the Bessarabian village Clocuşna (now Ocniţa District, Moldova); at the time, the area was part of Greater Romania. The Loteanu ancestry has Ukrainian origin, the original name was Lototskii.

His paternal ancestors were from Bukovina. After the annexation of Bessarabia to the Soviet Union, they moved to Bucharest. After the death of his father and losing contact with his mother, who had moved to Romania, he lived his early life on the streets, sleeping in warehouses and hostels. Between 1953 and 1955, he studied at the actor's faculty of the Moscow Art Theatre. In 1962, he graduated from VGIK (workshop of Grigori Roshal and Y. Genik).

Between 1952 and 1954, he worked as an actor at the Moscow Pushkin Drama Theatre. From 1962 to 1973, he worked as a director at the studio Moldova-Film where he made his narrative feature film debut with the heroic and revolutionary film Wait for us at dawn (1963). In 1966, Loteanu directed a motion picture about the Moldavian shepherds titled Red Meadows. He was a member of the Communist Party of the Soviet Union since the year 1968. In his cinematic poem Lăutarii (1971), the director depicted the life of folk musicians. The film's music was scored by Eugene Doga and was the beginning for their long collaboration. The film won the Silver Shell at the San Sebastián International Film Festival.

Since 1973, Loteanu worked at the studio Mosfilm. Film adaptations of Maxim Gorky's Gypsies Are Found Near Heaven and Anton Chekhov's A Hunting Accident, and the biographical film Anna Pavlova, dedicated to the life of the great Russian ballerina, brought him great popularity. In 1976, the film Gypsies Are Found Near Heaven won the Grand Prix – the "Golden Shell" – at the International Film Festival in San Sebastian. A waltz by Eugene Doga from the 1978 film A Hunting Accident became world-famous.

One of the producers of his 1983 film Anna Pavlova was Michael Powell. The film was a co-production between Britain and the Soviet Union and featured American director Martin Scorsese in a cameo role.

In 1979, Loteanu married actress Galina Belyayeva, who starred in his films A Hunting Accident and Anna Pavlova. Their marriage was a stormy one and lasted five years. They had one child.

In the late 1980s, he returned to "Moldova-Film" and worked on Moldovan television, where he made a film adaption of Mihai Eminescu's poem Luceafărul. Between 1987 and 1992, he was President of the Union of Cinematographers of Moldova. He taught courses for theater actors at the Chisinau Institute of Arts.

In 1998, he staged the play Unconditionally Yours, Antosha Chekhonte based on Chekhov's "The Bear" and "Wedding" at the Moscow Art Theatre named after M. Gorky. He is an author of several collections of poems and short stories, scripts of his films. He is also an author of poetry for the film The Eighth Wonder of the World (1981).

For twelve years, he was trying to get funding to make films. When Loteanu at long last got financing for his film project Yar he died, leaving the project unfinished. He died from cancer on 18 April 2003 in Moscow, at the age of 66. Galina Belyayeva and his doctors hid the diagnosis from him. He was buried at the Vagankovsky cemetery in Moscow.

Filmography 
 Bolshaya gora (1959) – director
 Zhil-byl malchik (1960) a.k.a. There Was a Young Boy – director
 Zhdite nas na rassvete (1963) a.k.a. Wait for Us at Dawn – director
 Krasnye polyany (1966) – writer/director
 Freska na belom (1967) – director
 Eto mgnovenie (1968) – director
 Akademik Tarasevich (1970) – director
 Lăutarii (1971) a.k.a. Fiddlers – writer/director
 Ekho goryachey doliny (1974) a.k.a. Their Torrid Valleys – director
 Tabor ukhodit v nebo (1975) a.k.a. Queen of the Gypsies – writer/director
 Moy laskovyy i nezhnyy zver (1978) a.k.a. A Hunting Accident – writer/director
 Anna Pavlova (1983) a.k.a. A Woman for All Time – writer/director, actor (the manager of cabaret)
 Luceafărul (1987) a.k.a. The Morning Star – writer/director
 Vdvoyom na grani vremeni (1989) – writer
 Skorlupa (1993) a.k.a. The Shell – director

See also 
 Moldova-Film
 Mosfilm

References

External links 

 
 
 

Romanian people of Moldovan descent
1936 births
2003 deaths
People from Ocnița District
Moldovan film directors
Soviet film directors
Academic staff of High Courses for Scriptwriters and Film Directors
Romanian emigrants to the Soviet Union
Romanian film directors
Moldovan expatriates in Russia
Russian people of Moldovan descent
Russian people of Romanian descent